Grijpstra & De Gier is a 1979 Dutch crime film directed by Wim Verstappen. It is based on the eponymous novel series by Jan Willem van de Wetering (although his name is usually styled Janwillem van de Wetering), specifically Het lijk in de Haarlemmer Houttuinen (translation: The Body in the Haarlemmer Houttuinen, a former neighbourhood in Amsterdam).

The film has also been released as Fatal Error and Outsider in Amsterdam. Although the film was not received to critical acclaim, it managed reasonable box-office success.

Cast
 Rijk de Gooyer as Henk Grijpstra
 Rutger Hauer as Rinus de Gier
 Willeke van Ammelrooy as Constanze Verboom
 Donald Jones as Habberdoedas Van Meteren
 Marina de Graaf as Helen
 Frederik de Groot as Simon Cardozo
 Jan Retèl as Commissaris
 Hans Croiset as De Kater
 Marjan Berk as Mevrouw Grijpstra
 Hilly Ruardy as Treesje
 Jaap Stobbe as Beuzekom
 Tom van Beek as Hoofdinspecteur
 Olaf Wijnants as Ringetje
 Joekie Broedelet as Miesje Verboom
 Eyk Backer

Synopsis
Grijpstra is a man who easily gets frustrated and acts out his anger by hitting people. De Gier is a womanizer. Chief suspect in this case is a former police officer. The case is originally about a man who seems to have hanged himself but which turns out to be a murder involving the drug trade.

Sequel
A sequel was made: De Ratelrat, in which Rutger Hauer was replaced by Peter Faber.

Spin-Off
The novels were also made into a spin-off television series which ran from 2004 to 2007, with Jack Wouterse as Grijpstra and Roef Ragas as de Gier.

References

External links 
 

1979 films
1979 crime films
Dutch crime films
1970s Dutch-language films
Police detective films
Films based on Dutch novels
Films produced by Rob Houwer